Borugagudem also spelled Burugu Gudem is a village in Eluru district of the Indian state of Andhra Pradesh. It is located in Pedapadu mandal of Eluru revenue division. The nearest train station is Bhadrachalam (BDCR) located at a distance of 31.2 KM.

Demographics 

 Census of India, Burugagudem had a population of 114. The total population constitute, 67 males and 77 females with a sex ratio of 1149 females per 1000 males. 15 children are in the age group of 0–6 years with sex ratio of 667. The average literacy rate stands at 80.62%.

References 

Villages in Eluru district